The Hendrie River is a  tributary of the Tahquamenon River on the Upper Peninsula of Michigan in the United States.

Water Cave
The river flows through the Hendrie River Water Cave, forming the longest cave in Michigan, at 1500 feet.  A stream exits from the cave to form the west branch of the Hendrie river.  This cave is managed by the Michigan Karst Conservancy.  A permit is required to enter, for reasons of safety and white nose disease.

See also
List of rivers of Michigan

References

Michigan  Streamflow Data from the USGS

Rivers of Michigan
Caves of Michigan
Tributaries of Lake Superior